Lola Amour is a Filipino rock band from Muntinlupa, Philippines that dabbles in the genres of modern rock, funk, and pop. The band consists of Pio Dumayas on lead vocals and guitar, Martin Kim on background vocals and keyboards, Raymond King on background vocals and bass, Zoe Gonzales on lead guitar, Angelo Mesina on trumpets, Joxx Perez on saxophone, and Renzo Santos on drums.

History

Formation (2013-2016) 
Lola Amour was formed in Muntinlupa from two rival bands, "Sinigang Na Baboy" and "Decaf", comprising students at De La Salle Santiago Zobel School. While the two bands always competed against each other in the annual school battle of the bands, they were friends as  members of student music clubs such as the DLSZ Symphonic Orchestra and DLSZ Jammers. The two bands decided to merge and perform at their senior year graduation ball. When the group moved on to college, they officially adopted the name "Lola Amour", after the grandmother of vocalist Pio Dumayas.

Wanderland Music and Arts Festival (2016)
Lola Amour performed at the fourth Wanderland Music and Arts Festival. The band won Wanderband 2017, the annual battle of the local independent bands of the music festival.

Don't Look Back EP (2017) 
Soon after performing at the Wanderland Music and Arts Festival, Lola Amour released their first EP titled "Don't Look Back", which consisted of four songs: Fools, Maybe Maybe, No Tomorrow and Piece of Mind.

Coke Studio Philippines (2019)
Lola Amour was included in the third season of the Coke Studio Philippines, an annual music television program in the Philippines. Notable songs released in this collaboration were "Sundan Mo Ko" with rapper Al James, cover versions of Pa-Umaga (original by Al James) and "Tuloy na Tuloy Pa Rin ang Pasko" featuring Al James (original by APO Hiking Society).

Band members

Current members
 Pio Dumayas - lead vocals, guitar (2013–present) 
 Raymond King - bass, backing vocals (2016–present)
 Zoe Gonzales - lead guitar (2016–present)
 Angelo Mesina - trumpets (2016–present)
 David Yuhico - keyboards, backing vocals (2021-present)

Former members
 Mico Fernandez - guitars (2013–2016) 
 Nathan Domagas - keyboard (2018–2020) 
Martin Kim - keyboards, backing vocals (2016–2021)
 Joxx Perez - sax (2016–2022), bass (2013)
 Renzo Santos - drums (2013–2022)

Other personnel
 Mika Ordoñez - general manager and booking agent

Discography
EPs
 Don't Look Back (2017)

Singles

References

External links

Filipino rock music groups
Filipino pop music groups
Musical groups from Metro Manila
Musical groups established in 2016
2016 establishments in the Philippines
Warner Music Philippines artists